Eduard van Roessel (7 September 1897 – 26 January 1976) was a Dutch footballer. He played in two matches for the Netherlands national football team in 1920.

References

External links
 

1897 births
1976 deaths
Dutch footballers
Netherlands international footballers
Place of birth missing
Association footballers not categorized by position